His 12 Greatest Hits is a compilation album by Neil Diamond, issued in 1974 on the MCA record label. As the title suggests, it contains twelve songs from Neil's catalogue.

The album contains songs from his tenure with Uni Records, from 1968 to 1972. After Neil had returned to Columbia Records, his earlier works were reissued on MCA Records, which was the parent company of Uni Records which had folded in the early 1970s.

Track listing

All songs written and composed by Neil Diamond.

Side one

 "Sweet Caroline" (Live) - 4:15
 "Brother Love's Traveling Salvation Show" - 3:26
 "Shilo" - 2:59
 "Holly Holy" (Live) - 5:40
 "Brooklyn Roads" - 3:39
 "Cracklin' Rosie" - 3:00

Side two

 "Play Me" - 3:49
 "Done Too Soon" - 2:45
 "Stones" - 3:03
 "Song Sung Blue" - 3:15
 "Soolaimon" - 4:33
 "I Am...I Said" - 3:32

© 1974 MCA Records

Alternate versions

Of the album's twelve songs, only ten were presented in their original studio versions. "Holly Holy" and "Sweet Caroline" were live recordings, taken from the live album Hot August Night. On the 1985 CD release of His 12 Greatest Hits, the studio versions appeared instead (but both songs were remixed and "Holly Holy" was a different version with a different vocal for a good part of the song), but a later reissue in 1993 reinstated the live versions of these two tracks.

Follow up

In 1982, Columbia Records released 12 Greatest Hits, Volume II, a follow-up to this album. It contains songs from the years 1973-1981.

Charts & Certifications

The album reached number 29 on the Billboard 200 chart. It was certified gold by the RIAA in 1974 and earned quadruple platinum status in 1993 for sales of four million units in the US.

Album

Certifications

References

1974 greatest hits albums
Neil Diamond compilation albums
MCA Records compilation albums